Swapnasundari is an upcoming Indian film made in Malayalam-language, directed by debutant Philip.K.J, starring Bigg Boss fame Rajith Kumar as leading actor. The principal photography of the film began in September 2020. Dr.Shinu Syamalan, who lost her job for reporting suspected COVID-19 case in Kerala makes her debut as heroine. Swami Gangeshananda, a bobbitisation victim, also plays an important role.

Plot 
Swapnasundari is a romantic film, where the story turns into a thriller with the mysterious deaths of some women and the investigation around it.

Cast 
 
Rajith Kumar	...	Zachariah Punnoose
Shinu Syamalan	...	Jamanthi
Sajan Palluruthy	...	Sugunan
Shivaji Guruvayoor	...	Arnold Jinto
Sreeram Mohan	...	Selvan
Rajee Thomas	...	Krishna's Wife
Benny Punnaram	...	Krishnan
Maneesha Mohan	...	Karishma
Pradeep Palluruthy	...	Ramayyer
Swami Gangeshananda ... Swapnananda
Sharlet Sajeev	...	Shanu's Love
Sanif Ali		...	Shanu
Divya Thomas	...	Vasanthi
Shancy Salam	...	Janaki
Sajid Salam	...	Kunjuse
Sharon Sahim	...	Mridula Rose Mammen
Bala Surya	...	Gopi Krishna
Nishad Kallingal... Vishnu
Sunny Sangamitra... Shuppandi
Firos Babu     ... Arjun
Janaki Devi   ... Jimikki Ammini
Ajai Puramala... Pavitran
Jinto Body Craft	...	John Zachariah

Production 
Subin Babu and Salam.B.T launched themselves into film production, supported by Shaju.C.George with Philip.K.J, a debutant helming the project with the leading man Rajith Kumar, a social activist and lecturer. Shancy Salam worked as production controller. Shinu Syamalen, a doctor by profession, was selected as the heroine in her debut. and Sreeram Mohan, grandson of veteran actor G.K.Pillai was signed to play a crucial supporting role, with newcomer Divya Thomas playing his pair. The cast and crew has several newcomers with the principal photography of the film started on 20 September 2020 at Thalayolaparambu. Soon Sharlet Sajeev was signed to play another heroine of the film, that had Poopara, Munnar and Abu Dhabi as major locations. Swami Gangeshananda, who became (in)famous because of a bobbitisation attack, also was penciled in to play an important role.

References

External links
 

Upcoming films
Films shot in Abu Dhabi
Upcoming directorial debut films
Films shot in Munnar